Pam Rehm (born October 21, 1967 New Cumberland, Pennsylvania) is an American poet.

Life
Her work has appeared in Talisman, The Transcendental Friend, and The Nation.

Education
Graduated from Shippensburg University of Pennsylvania

Awards
 1994 National Poetry Series, for To Give It Up, selected by Barbara Guest

Works
"Indebted", Duration Press
"Journey Home", Duration Press
"An Empty Account", Duration Press
"Acts of Love", Poetry Foundation
"Acts of Vexation", Poetry Foundation
   (chapbook)

Anthologies

Reviews
Rehm is an iconoclast not because she is, at times, formally inventive but because she reaches for what can't be seen, that is, she strives for knowledge of "what it means to be in relation." Her insurgency should, at least partly, become ours. Rehm is not the only one who must "figure out what to believe and where to begin." To do this, must we open our cabinets and break open the black egg that may hide our conscious ear?

The poems in Small Works are short pieces and sequences of short pieces—small works—but "small" describes not only their length but the pieces' style as well. The poems are spare.

Judging from the beautifully wrought poetic accomplishments of Small Works, mothering and poetry for Pam Rehm have without doubt combined to create a productive paradox, an incisive kind of linguistic and philosophical stirring into or mulling over life-as-lived, through commonplace yet uniquely employed forms of rhetorical sharing in soulful, songful contradiction.

References

Living people
1967 births
American women poets
21st-century American poets
People from Cumberland County, Pennsylvania
21st-century American women writers